Calloway Manes Homestead, also known as Doris and Raymond Powers House, is a historic home located near Richland, Pulaski County, Missouri.  It was built about 1845, and is a two-story, five bay, frame I-house with a two-story rear ell.  The front facade features a two-story porch supporting six hollow square wood columns.  It is one of the oldest residences in Pulaski County.

It was listed on the National Register of Historic Places in 1980.

References

Houses on the National Register of Historic Places in Missouri
Houses completed in 1845
Buildings and structures in Pulaski County, Missouri
National Register of Historic Places in Pulaski County, Missouri